Red Quill Books was founded in 2009 by a group of scholars led by professor George S. Rigakos, based out of Carleton University in Ottawa, Canada.  The press, however, has no formal association with Carleton University.  The primary mission of the press is to create a venue for reanimating classic, radical texts through comic book or manga formats aimed at a new generation of student, faculty and general readers.   Red Quill Books has also sought to develop as sizable catalogue of critical academic books. A founding principle of the press is to funnel a portion of its revenues toward student scholarships in order to support future critical research.

Early notoriety
A year after its launch, Red Quill Books earned some early notoriety for its four-part Communist Manifesto Illustrated series which elicited attention in North America. Red Quill Books has followed this with the release of Capital in Manga which is the English translation of the Manga de Dokuha version produced by East Press, and The Last Days of Che Guevara, derived from the Italian comic entitled Que Viva El Che Guevara.

References

Notable releases

 Mark, Karl and Frederik Engels. Edited by: George S. Rigakos.  Illustrated by Victor Serra. (2010) The Communist Manifesto Illustrated.  Chapter One – Historical Materialism. Ottawa: Red Quill Books 
 Marx, Karl. Edited by: Variety Artworks. Translated by: Guy Yasko. Capital in Manga! Ottawa: Red Quill Books 
 Rizzo, Marco and Lelio Bonaccorso (Illustrator). (2014) The Last Days of Che Guevara: A Graphic Novel Ottawa: Red Quill Books

External links
 Red Quill Books 
 Che Guevara Biography Illustrated

Comic book publishing companies of Canada
Companies based in Ottawa